Taisun (Taishan) is the name of the world's strongest crane which has a safe working load of 20,000 metric tons (22,046 short tons).  Taisun is designed by DHHI (Dalian Huarui Heavy Industry) and built for the installation of very large modules in semi submersibles and FPSO projects. It is located at Yantai Raffles Shipyard in Yantai, Shandong Province, China. The crane holds the three heaviest lifts of all time respectively: 20,133 metric tons, 17,100 tons and 14,000 tons.

The amount of wire required to operate Taisun is nearly 50,000 meters or just over 31 miles, allowing it to lift a maximum of 80 meters.

Concept 
Taisun was built to install very large (up to 20,000 tons) integrated modules on top of a vessel's hull. Traditionally, offshore vessels such as drilling semi submersibles or FPSOs were built from the ground up in modules of 1000 to 2000 tons, which meant that much installation, hook up and commissioning work was left to be done on board where access is limited and efficiency lower.

Taisun facilitates simultaneous construction of the lower and upper parts of the vessel which allows for a shorter overall project schedule, manpower improvements of up to two million man-hours while safety and quality levels are improved.

Awards 
Guinness World RecordTaisun holds the world record for "heaviest weight lifted by crane", set in Yantai on April 18, 2008 at 20,133 metric tonnes (44,385,667.25 lb) by lifting a barge, ballasted with water.

Spotlight on New TechnologyDuring the Offshore Technology Conference (OTC) 2008, Taisun received the Spotlight on New Technology Award for improving safety, speed and efficiency during construction of offshore production vessels.

In order to win the award, Taisun met four technology criteria: 

(1) The technology must be less than two years old and must not be in violation of any known patents

(2) The technology must be proven through full-scale application or successful prototype testing

(3) The technology must have broad appeal for the industry at large

(4) And the technology must offer substantial benefits over current technologies.

Woelfel Best Mechanical Engineering Achievement 2008During the Offshore Technology Conference (OTC) 2008, Taisun received the Woelfel Best Mechanical Engineering Achievement Award from the American Society of Mechanical Engineers. This award recognizes technologies which are novel, have a significant impact on the offshore industry, meet health, safety, and environmental standards, and are well conceptualized and developed.

Particulars

References

External links
 
 www.slideshare.net (Presentation of COSL Pioneer deck box lift)
 Google 3D warehouse (downloadable 3d model of Taisun)

Videos
 Construction of Taisun
 Taisun's first project, installing the 14000-ton deck box of the COSL Pioneer
 Taisun sets world record for Heaviest Topsides Crane Lift with Saipem's Scarabeo 9
 TAISUN installs the 12,000-ton deck box of Schahin's SS Amazonia

Individual cranes (machines)
Yantai